Sherwood is an unincorporated community in Calhoun County, Iowa, in the United States.

History
Sherwood was originally called Mosely, and under the latter name was platted in 1899. It was later renamed Sherwood when the post office was established.

References

Unincorporated communities in Calhoun County, Iowa
Unincorporated communities in Iowa